BBC Sounds is a streaming media and audio download service from the BBC that includes live radio broadcasts, audio on demand, and podcasts. The service is available on a wide range of devices, including mobile phones and tablets, personal computers, cars, and smart televisions. Media delivered to UK-based listeners does not feature commercial advertising.

Service

The BBC Sounds website replaced the iPlayer Radio service for UK users in October 2018. An initial beta version of the BBC Sounds app was launched in June 2018, with both the new app and the iPlayer Radio app supported until September 2019, when the iPlayer Radio app was finally decommissioned in the UK. Since 22 September 2020, BBC Sounds has been available to international users; it replaced BBC iPlayer Radio for international audiences at the end of October 2020. An app for Connected TVs (including Amazon Fire TV) was released in March 2020. An Apple tvOS app is also in development. BBC Sounds differs from iPlayer Radio by acting as a place for original podcast material created by the BBC specifically for the app in addition to live and catch-up listening of its linear radio services. One example of this is the Beyond Today podcast, a daily online-only 17 minute podcast produced by the Today team, exploring an issue in-depth with a younger audience in mind.

The BBC has also announced plans to make podcasts from third-party producers available within the BBC Sounds service.

At launch the BBC Sounds service caused controversy amongst some users of the former iPlayer Radio app, who claimed that the functionality did not have the same features as before, objected to the login requirements, and raised concerns that the new app was no longer supported on older versions of smartphones. Some broadsheet newspapers have claimed that these changes disproportionately affect older listeners, particularly those who listen to speech and comedy content on BBC Radio 4.

Development 
BBC Sounds on the web was built from the ground up with Node.js, React, Redux, and Express.js. The mobile applications were written in Swift for iOS, and in Kotlin for Android. The apps were released on 26 June 2018, before the website had any 'Sounds' branding, in order to gain early feedback.

App features include the ability to look up station schedules, download and share media, rewind live radio, and listen in-car via either Android Auto or Apple CarPlay.

Both the website and the apps are served with data from a single set of APIs called Radio and Music Services, or RMS, microservices built in the Scala programming language. This single source of data replaces a large number of different services that powered earlier incarnations of the radio products.

See also

 UKTV Play
 BBC Select (streaming service)
 BBC iPlayer
 BBC Radio Explorer
 BBC Player (for Singapore and Malaysia only)
 BBC Three (streaming service)
 BritBox

References

External links

BBC New Media
Media players
Internet radio in the United Kingdom
2018 software
2018 establishments in the United Kingdom
Internet properties established in 2018
British podcasts